Barnhill railway station is in Glasgow, Scotland,  north of Glasgow Queen Street railway station on the Springburn branch of the North Clyde Line. The station is managed by ScotRail.

It was built as part of the City of Glasgow Union Railway which provided a link across the Clyde (between the Glasgow and Paisley Joint Railway at Shields Junction and the Edinburgh and Glasgow Railway at Sighthill Junction). Services through to Springburn were not introduced until 1887.

The Bellgrove to Springburn line was electrified by British Rail in 1960 as part of the North Clyde line scheme.

Services 

Monday to Saturday daytimes there is a half-hourly service from Barnhill to Glasgow Queen Street and beyond (usually to  via Yoker) southbound and to Springburn northbound.  Connections are available at the latter for stations further east.

Sundays see an hourly service between Partick and Springburn between 9am and 8pm.

References

External links

Railway stations in Glasgow
Former North British Railway stations
Railway stations in Great Britain opened in 1883
Railway stations in Great Britain closed in 1917
Railway stations in Great Britain opened in 1919
SPT railway stations
Railway stations served by ScotRail
Springburn